Carnival is a 1981 Soviet romantic comedy directed by Tatyana Lioznova.

Plot
In a small Uralic city lives a young woman, Nina Solomatina, with her mother. Her father left her as a child and moved to Moscow. Dreaming study acting, Nina comes to Moscow, but fails the entrance examinations to the theatrical school. Deciding to try to enter next year, Nina temporarily moves in with her father and his family. Striving to provide for herself, she goes to work, but because of various incidents, she is not able to stay anywhere for a long time. In her personal life, Nina also suffers a fiascoMuscovite student Nikita very quickly breaks up with her for a new girl. As a result, Nina begins to understand that the big city is not the eternal carnival she imagined it to be, and instead of conquering the world, the main heroine returns to her hometo care of her ill mother.

The film ends on an ambiguous noteNina Solomatina appears as a famous singer performing at the full hall, it is not clear if all this is real, or just her imagination.

Cast
Irina Muravyova as Nina Solomatina (song by Zhanna Rozhdestvenskaya)
Yury Yakovlev as Mikhail Solomatin, father of Nina
Klara Luchko as Josephine Viktorovna, the wife of Mikhail Solomatin
Aleksandr Abdulov as Nikita
Vera Vasilyeva as Nikita's mother
Alevtina Rumyantseva as mother of Nina
Ekaterina Zhemchuzhnaya as Karma
Alexander Mikhailov as Remizov
Lidiya Smirnova as Chairman of the Commission
Valentina Titova as landlady
Zinaida Vorkul as Zinaida, Solomatin's mother
Georgy Zhemchuzhny as Karma's husband
Andrey Gusev as barking entrant with kefir
Yelena Maksimova as visitor of the pawnshop
Olga Blok-Mirimskaya as femme fatale from the movie in the cinema
Vyacheslav Baranov as Zhenya
Vadim Andreev as Vadim Arturovich
Vladimir Balashov as member of the Admission Committee
Vladimir Smirnov as neighbor who brought a table
Roman Monastyrsky as Dima, Nina's paternal half-brother
Margarita Zharova as conductor
Claudia Kozlenkova as woman in the subway
Anatoly Pidgorodetsky as  entrant
Tamara Yarenko as neighbor
Yakov Belenky as neighbor

Reception
Carnival was the ninth most popular film at the box-office in the Soviet Union in 1982; it was seen by 30,4 million viewers.

In the same year, for her leading performance, Irina Muravyova was recognized as the best actress according to the results of a survey of readers of the magazine Soviet Screen.

References

External links

Gorky Film Studio films
1981 romantic comedy films
1981 films
Soviet romantic comedy films
Soviet musical comedy films
1980s musical comedy films
Films directed by Tatyana Lioznova
Russian romantic comedy films
Films scored by Maksim Dunayevsky
1980s Russian-language films